Lyko is a surname. Notable people with this surname include:

 Antoni Łyko (1907–1941), Polish footballer
 Uwe Lyko (born 1954), German comedian and cabaretist

See also
 

Czech-language surnames
Polish-language surnames
Ukrainian-language surnames